John Fordyce (died 1751) was a Church of England priest who was ordained in Pembrokeshire, Wales. Fordyce was posted to St John's, Newfoundland, where he appears to have had a fractious relationship with the residents after an initial warm welcome. In 1735 Fordyce asked for a transfer to South Carolina as a missionary. In 1736 he occupied his new parish of Prince Frederick, South Carolina.

References 

Year of birth missing
1751 deaths
Welsh Anglican missionaries
Anglican missionaries in Canada
Anglican missionaries in the United States
18th-century Welsh Anglican priests